Ymer is an annual peer-reviewed academic journal published by the Swedish Society for Anthropology and Geography. It was established in 1881 and published quarterly until 1965, when it converted to an annual rhythm. The journal is abstracted and indexed in Scopus.

Ymer Island is named after the journal, which had published many accounts of Swedish expeditions to Spitsbergen and Greenland.

References

External links 
 Archive digitalized by Projekt Runeberg
 Description in Nordisk familjebok

Geography journals
Publications established in 1881
Academic journals published by learned and professional societies
Annual journals
Swedish-language journals
1881 establishments in Sweden